Fateh Gharbi, commonly called Fatah Ghari (born 12 March 1983) is Tunisian former professional footballer who played as a left-back for CS Sfaxien in the Tunisian Ligue Professionnelle 1. He made nine appearances for the Tunisia national team, also appearing at the 2013 Africa Cup of Nations.

Career statistics
Scores and results list Tunisia's goal tally first, score column indicates score after each Gharbi goal.

Honours 
CS Sfaxien
 CAF Confederation Cup: 2007, 2008

Tunisia
 African Nations Championship: 2011

References 

1983 births
Living people
Tunisian footballers
Association football fullbacks
Tunisia international footballers
Tunisian Ligue Professionnelle 1 players
CS Sfaxien players
2013 Africa Cup of Nations players
2011 African Nations Championship players
Tunisia A' international footballers